Jamna is a settlement in the Slovene Hills in the Municipality of Sveti Jurij ob Ščavnici in northeastern Slovenia. The area is part of the traditional region of Styria and is now included in the Mura Statistical Region.

Two small chapels in the settlement date to the second half of the 19th century.

References

External links
Jamna at Geopedia

Populated places in the Municipality of Sveti Jurij ob Ščavnici